This is a gallery of flags of municipalities in Cundinamarca in Colombia.

Cundinamarca

Almeidas

Central Magdalena

Central Sabana

Eastern

Gualiva

Guavio

Lower Magdalena

Soacha

Sumapaz

Tequendama

Upper Magdalena

Western Sabana

Flags of municipalities of Colombia
Cundinamarca Department